Cameron Courtney Brown (born April 1, 1998) is an American football linebacker for the New York Giants of the National Football League (NFL). He played college football at Penn State.

Early life and high school career
Brown began his high school career at James Hubert Blake High School in Silver Spring, Maryland before transferring to Bullis School in Potomac, Maryland, where he played high school football as a linebacker. He graduated in the Class of 2016.

College career
At Penn State, Brown played in 51 total games, with 26 starts. Brown was a team captain as a senior and recorded 72 tackles, 5.5 for a loss, 2 sacks, and 4 passes defensed. He earned Third-team All-Big Ten honors.

Professional career

Brown was selected by the New York Giants in the sixth round with the 183rd pick in the 2020 NFL Draft.

On September 25, 2021, Brown was placed on injured reserve with a hamstring injury. He was activated on October 16.

References

External links
New York Giants bio
Penn State Nittany Lions bio

1998 births
Living people
American football linebackers
New York Giants players
Penn State Nittany Lions football players
People from Burtonsville, Maryland
Players of American football from Maryland
Sportspeople from Montgomery County, Maryland